Fermax is a company that designs, manufactures, and commercializes audio and video door entry systems and access control systems. The head office is located in the city of Valencia, Spain, where the company was founded by Fernando Maestre in 1949.

History 
The company, which has always focused on intercoms, started out its activity by marketing a radio intercom for industrial and professional use. By 1963, their experience allowed them to launch a new intercom, this time designed for apartment blocks or buildings, in other words, an audio door entry system. It was the first to be designed exclusively in Spain and for years remained the only one.

The vertical residential structure adopted in Spanish developmentalism helped spread the audio entry system's use as an item of mass consumption and facilitated the company's development. In 1974, Fermax began producing its type T-1 interphone model, a wall-mounted receiver that held sway in the market until 1987, and went on to manufacture 4,500,000 units of what is considered one of the icons of Spanish industrial design. Fermax started manufacturing video door entry systems as of 1980 and subsequently went on to include other access control systems.

21st century 

By 2011, the firm had offices in 15 countries and trade agreements for the distribution of its products in 65 nations. Fermax products were installed in building projects all over the world, en Melbourne, Dubai, Bilbao (Spain), and Singapore. This international presence was acknowledged with an award from the IVEX in 2011. Their working model has also been recognised, among others, by the ESADE Brand Centre, being granted the Brand Centre prize in 2010 in the B2B category.
For technological research, Fermax runs two laboratories, one for each production plant. In 2006, the company signed an agreement with the University of Valencia to create the Fermax Chair in Building Automation and became a member of ITACA, the Research Laboratory at the Polytechnic University of Valencia.

Design 
Industrial design was a task entrusted almost exclusively to designer Ramón Benedito, who in 1992 received the National Design Award granted by the Ministry of Industry. Fermax design has been awarded several times:
 1976: Award for Industrial Design Promotion. Granted by the BCD Foundation
 1991: Prize for Innovation in Industrial Design. Awarded by IMPIVA (Valencian Regional Government) for the City panels
 2005: Intel Design Augusto Morello. Awarded by Intel Milan for the Loft monitor
 2007: ADI-FAD selection for the Halo outdoor panel and iLoft video entry monitor
 2013: ADI-FAD selection for the Smile video entry monitor
Fermax products have taken part in the following exhibitions:
 1998: Industrial design in Spain. Museo Reina Sofia Madrid
 2007: Two centuries of industrialisation in the Valencian Community. MuVIM. Valencia
 2007: ADI-FAD selection. Barcelona
 2008: Ibero-American Design Biennial I. DIMAD. El Matadero. Madrid
 2009: Suma y sigue del disseny a la Comunitat Valenciana. MuVIM. Valencia. Brussels. Madrid
 2010: Valencia Design and Innovation. Bancaja Foundation. Valencia

See also
Courtesy phone
Speaking tube
Intercom
Video door phone
Door phone

References

External links 
 Fermax Official Website

Manufacturing companies of Spain
Spanish brands
Companies based in Valencia